Roberto Longhi (28 December 1890 – 3 June 1970) was an Italian academic, art historian, and curator. The main subjects of his studies were the painters Caravaggio and Piero della Francesca.

Early life and career
Longhi was born in December 1890 in Alba in Piedmont. His parents were from Emilia. He studied with Pietro Toesca, in Turin, and Adolfo Venturi in Rome. The latter made him book reviews editor of the journal L'Arte in 1914. Between 1913 and 1917, Longhi, primarily an essayist, published text in L'Arte and La Voce on Mattia Preti, Piero della Francesca, Orazio Borgianni and Orazio Gentileschi.

Over the course of his career Longhi developed a fascination with Caravaggio and his followers. his book Quesiti caravaggeschi [Questions on Caravaggio] (1928–34), was followed by Ultimi studi caravaggeschi [Latest Caravaggio studies] (1943). In 1951, Longhi curated a ground-breaking exhibition on Caravaggio at the Royal Palace in Milan, Mostra di Caravaggio e dei Caravaggeschi. In 1968 he authored a monograph on the artist.

Whilst establishing himself as a notable Caravaggio scholar, Longhi retained a lively interest in Piero della Francesca, editing a monograph in 1928, representing him as the leading painter of the Quattrocento. Longhi believed Piero della Francesca played a decisive role in the development of Venetian painting. This monograph, which Kenneth Clark opined could hardly be improved upon, established itself as a classic of art-historical literature.

Between 1920 and 1922, Longhi made a Grand Tour of Europe. He never visited Russia, nor some American collections, like the Kress Collection of the National Gallery, Washington. However, his first-hand viewing of many works, like those in the Borghese Gallery in Rome, led to the rediscovery of many lost masterpieces such as two panels of a Giotto altarpiece.

Longhi also rekindled interest in a large number of followers of Caravaggio, such as Hendrick ter Brugghen (he edited a monograph in 1927) and some painters from Ferrara. His book Officina Ferrarese (1934) still stands as an exemplary study. Along with the publication of the Officina, Longhi started his academic career, first as Professor at Bologna University (from 1935), and later in Florence.

Role in Nazi art looting 
During the Second World War, Longhi advised Eugenio Ventura, a dealer in Florence, who was investigated for his involvement in an exchange of pictures confiscated by the Nazi looting organisation known as the ERR or Reichsleiter Rosenberg Taskforce. He also advised Count Alessandro Contini-Bonacossi (1878-1955) until 1945.

Postwar 
In 1950, Longhi co-founded and edited with Anna Banti Paragone, a bi-monthly magazine on art and literature still running to this day.

Longhi also curated a number of exhibitions, including Mostra della pittura bolognese del Trecento (Pinacoteca Nazionale, Bologna, 1948); I pittori della realtà in Lombardia (Palazzo Reale, Milan, 1953); and Arte lombarda dai Visconti agli Sforza (Palazzo Reale, Milan, 1958).

Longhi died on 3 June 1970, and is buried at Cimitero degli Allori in Florence.

References

Bibliography

External links

 Roberto Longhi Biography in Archivio della scuola Romana

1890 births
1970 deaths
20th-century Italian people
Italian art historians
Italian art critics
Italian art curators
Italian magazine editors
People from the Province of Cuneo
Academic staff of the University of Bologna